Hosmer is a surname. Notable people with the surname include:

Andrew Hosmer (born 1964), New Hampshire state senator
Bradley C. Hosmer (born 1937), twelfth Superintendent of the United States Air Force Academy
Craig Hosmer (1915–1982), United States Representative from California
Eric Hosmer (born 1989), American professional baseball player
Frederick Lucian Hosmer (1840–1929), American Unitarian hymnist
George Hosmer (1781–1861), U.S. lawyer and politician 
George Washington Hosmer (1804–1881), American educator
Harriet Goodhue Hosmer (1830–1908), American sculptor
Hezekiah L. Hosmer (1765–1814), U.S. Representative from New York
Hezekiah Lord Hosmer (judge) (1814–1893), American lawyer, judge, journalist, and author
James Kendall Hosmer (1834–1927), American educator, historian and writer
Jean Hosmer (1842–1890), American actress
Ralph Hosmer (1874–1963), Hawaii's First Forester
Stephen Hosmer (1763–1834), Connecticut jurist
Titus Hosmer (1736–1780), Continental Congressman from Connecticut and father of Stephen Hosmer
Thomas Hosmer Shepherd (1793–1864), English watercolor artist
Trina Hosmer (born 1945), American cross-country skier
William Hosmer (1810–1889), American anti-slavery author and editor
William Howe Cuyler Hosmer (1814–1877), American poet